Pigneto is an underground station of Line C of the Rome Metro. The station is located at Via del Pigneto (hence the name) and will serve as an interchange with the FL1 regional railway once the station of the same name serving that line will be built.
Construction works of the metro station started in 2007 and were finished in January 2015. The station opened in June 2015.

References

Rome Metro Line C stations
Railway stations opened in 2015
2015 establishments in Italy
Rome Q. VII Prenestino-Labicano
Railway stations in Italy opened in the 21st century